Al Fatih Municipality or Al Fatah  was one of the municipalities (baladiyat) of Libya in the northeastern part of the country from 1983–1988.   Its capital was Marj. When Al Fatih ceased to exist in 1988 some of its territory became the smaller Marj District.

Major cities and towns

Bounds
Al Fatih was bounded on the north by the Mediterranean Sea, on the east by Jabal al Akhdar, on the south by Ajdabiya, and on the east by Benghazi District.

Municipalities of Libya (1983–1995)